Malacostola is a genus of moths in the family Lasiocampidae. The genus was erected by Yves de Lajonquière in 1970.

Species
Malacostola mediodiluta de Lajonquière, 1972
Malacostola mollis de Lajonquière, 1970
Malacostola mutata de Lajonquière, 1970
Malacostola psara de Lajonquière, 1972
Malacostola serrata de Lajonquière, 1972
Malacostola torrefacta de Lajonquière, 1972

References

Lasiocampidae